Julia James (1890–1964) was an English actress of the 1900s Edwardian era, the leading lady at the Gaiety Theatre.

Biography
Julia James was born in London in 1890.

In 1905 she began her career in Supper Belle in Blue Bell at the Aldwych Theatre under Seymour Hicks. She was the leading lady at the Gaiety Theatre, appearing in The Girls of Gottenburg, Havana, and Our Miss Gibbs.

In 1913 she had the role of Sombra in The Arcadians at L'Olympia, Paris.

In 1916 she performed at the London Opera House in Christmas in the Trenches.

In 1919 she played as Mabel Mannering in Yes, Uncle!.

She died in 1964.

References

1890 births
1964 deaths
Actresses from London